Oberea is a genus of longhorn beetles, most of which are stem borers of various plants, including blackberries and their relatives.

See also
 List of Oberea species

References

 
Cerambycidae genera